PEC Zwolle was founded in 1910 and joined the Dutch Football League in 1956. The team played in the Eredivisie for the first time in 1978–79. The table details the club's achievements in all first team competitions, and records their top goalscorer, for each completed season.

Key

Key to league record:
P = Played
W = Games won
D = Games drawn
L = Games lost
F = Goals for
A = Goals against
Pts = Points
Pos = Final position

Key to divisions:
Div 2 = Tweede Divisie
Div 1 = Eerste Divisie
Ere = Eredivisie

Key to rounds:
DNE = Did not enter
Grp = Group stage
R1 = Round 1
R2 = Round 2
R3 = Round 3
R4 = Round 4
QF = Quarter-finals
SF = Semi-finals
RU = Runners-up
W = Winners

Divisions in bold indicate a change in division.
Players in bold indicate the top scorer in the division that season.

Seasons

See also
 List of PEC Zwolle (women) seasons

References

Seasons
Zwolle